Slavija may refer to:
 the Serbo-Croatian, Macedonian and Slovene (?) name for Slavia, a general term for an area inhabited by Slavs
 Slavija Osijek, a former football club from Osijek, Croatia
 Slavija Square, a public square in Belgrade, Serbia
 Slavija (Novi Sad), a former municipality of the city of Novi Sad in Serbia
 Slavija Istočno Sarajevo, football club from Sarajevo, Bosnia and Herzegovina
 FK Slavija Kragujevac, football club from Kragujevac, Serbia
 FK Slavija Novi Sad, football club from Novi Sad, Serbia
 NK Slavija Vevče, a former football club from Ljubljana, Slovenia

See also
 Slavia (disambiguation)
 Sclavonia (disambiguation)